Lullaby of Broadway is a 1951 American musical romantic comedy film directed by David Butler and released by Warner Bros. It stars Doris Day as Melinda Howard, an entertainer who travels to New York to see her mother, and Gene Nelson as Tom Farnham, a fellow entertainer and Melinda's love interest. Gladys George appears as Jessica Howard, Melinda's alcoholic mother, in addition to  S.Z. Sakall, Billy De Wolfe, Florence Bates, and Anne Triola.

Songs from the film were released in an album of the same name.

Plot 
Melinda Howard is an entertainer traveling from England to pay a surprise visit to her mother, Broadway singer Jessica Howard, who lives in New York City. Melinda believes that her mother lives in a mansion, however, Jessica's alcoholism has reduced her to singing in a Greenwich Village saloon, and the mansion actually belongs to Adolph Hubbell and his wife.

The Hubbells' butler, Lefty Mack, and his fiancée, Gloria Davis, the maid, are a down-on-their luck vaudeville team and are good friends of Jessica and have been forwarding her letters to Melinda. Lefty pretends that Jessica has rented the house to the Hubbells while she is on tour, and, when a disappointed Melinda discloses that she has no money, offers her one of the servants' rooms for the night. Lefty promises Melinda that her mother will return home soon, and then informs Jessica of her daughter's arrival. He then suggests that she come to the house the next night when the Hubbells will be giving a party attended by many Broadway performers.

Meanwhile, Adolph has discovered Melinda's presence, and after Lefty explains the situation, agrees to keep Jessica's secret. At the party, Melinda awaits her mother's arrival, and while waiting, sees that one of party guests brought along Tom Farnham, who was on the boat with Melinda and had made a pass at her. He had also kept his profession a secret while on the boat. At the party, he entertains the crowd with a song and dance, as he is the male lead in George Ferndel's newest production, Lullaby of Broadway.

Ferndel, the Broadway producer, tries to persuade Adolphe to invest in his latest show, something Adolph refuses to do unless he is able to help cast the production. Jessica fails to appear at the party because she has been hospitalized with delirium tremens and Lefty explains to Melinda that Jessica's show was too popular for her to leave, which leads Melinda to vow to wait for her.

In an attempt to cheer up Melinda, Lefty suggests to Adolph that he take her to dinner and present her to Ferndel as the potential new star of his show. Ferndel is impressed by Melinda's performance, and as a reward, Adolph decides to buy Melinda a fur coat. Tom happens to see him in the fur shop, and Adolphe has to beg him to keep it a secret. The fur arrives at the house and Gloria is horrified, as she believes Adolphe's intentions are far from fatherly. Melinda, upset by the insinuations, insists on returning the coat, and informs Lefty and Gloria that they will both have parts in the musical.

Before the coat is returned, however, Mrs. Hubbell finds it and believes that it is a surprise for her. She wears it that night to a charity ball where Melinda sees her and candidly remarks to Tom that the coat had originally been meant for her. Tom misinterprets her statements, and the two quarrel bitterly. Although Jessica has been released from the hospital, she fears Melinda's reaction to her present state and refuses to meet with her.

Right before the show opens, Mrs. Hubbell learns the truth about the fur, and names Melinda in a divorce suit against Mr. Hubbell. Tom offers to "forgive" the shocked Melinda, and she realizes that he, too, thought she was romantically involved with Adolph. Shortly afterward, an aggressive reporter recognizes Jessica's picture and tells Melinda the truth about her mother. Completely shattered, Melinda decides to return to England and begs Lefty to pay for her ticket. Gloria and Lefty meet Melinda at the ship and escort her to a stateroom where Jessica is waiting. Mother and daughter are tearfully reunited, and Lefty informs them that Mrs. Hubbell now knows that there was nothing between Melinda and Adolph. They all leave together for the theater, where opening night is a success, and Tom and Melinda are free to pursue their romance.

Cast
 Doris Day - Melinda Howard
 Gene Nelson - Tom Farnham
 S.Z. Sakall - Adolph Hubbell
 Billy De Wolfe - Lefty Mack
 Gladys George - Jessica Howard
 Florence Bates - Mrs. Anna Hubbell
 Anne Triola - Gloria Davis

Musical numbers
 Lullaby of Broadway - Doris Day
 music and lyrics by Harry Warren and Al Dubin
 You're Getting to Be a Habit with Me - Doris Day
 music and lyrics by Harry Warren and Al Dubin
 Just One of Those Things - Doris Day
 music and lyrics by Cole Porter
 Somebody Loves Me - Doris Day and Gene Nelson (dubbed by Hal Derwin)
 music by George Gershwin, lyrics by B. G. DeSylva and Ballard MacDonald
 I Love the Way You Say Goodnight - Doris Day and Gene Nelson (dubbed by Hal Derwin)
 music and lyrics by Eddie Pola and George Wyle
 Please Don't Talk About Me When I'm Gone - Gladys George
 music and lyrics by Sam H. Stept, Sidney Clare and Bee Palmer
 In a Shanty in Old Shanty Town - Gladys George
 music and lyrics by Jack Little, John Siras and Joe Young
 Zing! Went the Strings of My Heart - Gene Nelson (dubbed by Hal Derwin)
 music and lyrics by James F. Hanley
 You're Dependable - Billy De Wolfe and Anne Triola
 music and lyrics by Sy Miller and Jerry Seelen
 We'd Like to Go on a Trip - Billy De Wolfe and Anne Triola
 music and lyrics by Sy Miller and Jerry Seelen

Reception
According to Warner Bros records the film earned $2,102,000 domestically and $983,000 foreign.

References

External links

 
 
 

1951 films
1951 musical comedy films
1951 romantic comedy films
Films directed by David Butler
Warner Bros. films
Films set in New York City
1950s English-language films